Apophis is an EP by Black Rain and Shapednoise, released on August 20, 2015 by Blackest Ever Black.

Track listing

Personnel 
Adapted from the Apophis liner notes.

Black Rain
 Stuart Argabright – instruments, production, mixing, painting

Shapednoise
 Nino Pedone – instruments, production, mixing

Additional performers
 Miles Whittaker – remix (B1)

Production and design
 Pasquale Ascione – design
 Matt Colton – mastering

Release history

References

External links 
 
 
 Apophis at Bandcamp
 Apophis at iTunes

2015 EPs
Black Rain (band) albums